The National Association of School Superintendents (NASS), is a professional organization of school superintendents in the United States. It was founded in 2009, with headquarters in Burlingame, California 94010. NASS’s members are superintendents and CEO-level equivalents from school districts in every state and region of the country.

Since January 2016, NASS has been operated through a partnership with the Association of California School Administrators, which is headquartered in Sacramento, CA 95814.

Membership
Membership is open to both active and retired superintendents, the chief executive officers of school districts. As of January 1, 2015, the association's website reported members in 40 states. There are nearly 20,000 school districts whose superintendents, past or present, are eligible for membership.

Legislative Advocacy
NASS provides legislative advocacy at the national level.

See also
 History of education in the United States
 Unified school district

References
 

Education-related professional associations